Wits Led by the Nose; Or, A Poet's Revenge is a 1677 comedy play by the English writer William Chamberlayne. It was first staged by the King's Company at the Theatre Royal, Drury Lane in London.

The original Drury Lane cast included Cardell Goodman as  Antellus, Edward Lydall as Oroandes, Carey Perin as Zannazarro, Marmaduke Watson as Arratur, Martin Powell as  Vanlore, Joseph Haines as Sir Symon Credulous, John Coysh as Dick Slywit and Elizabeth Boutell as Glorianda.

References

Bibliography
 Van Lennep, W. The London Stage, 1660-1800: Volume One, 1660-1700. Southern Illinois University Press, 1960.

1677 plays
West End plays
Restoration comedy